Hrudaya Sangama is a 1972 Indian Kannada language drama film directed by Rashi Brothers and produced by MJM Productions. It starred Rajkumar and Bharathi. The film was part black-and-white and part color, thus making it a partial color film. Vijaya Bhaskar scored the music and the story was written by H. N. Muddukrishna.The movie saw a theatrical run of 18 weeks.

The film, upon release, was critically acclaimed and went on to win the Karnataka State Award for fourth best film for the year 1972–73.

Rajkumar plays a dual role in the movie. However, this movie is not considered as a movie with double role since the second character appears only for three minutes on-screen in spite of it being an important plot twist.

Cast 
 Rajkumar as Jamindaar Rajanna and Kumar ( dual roles)
 Bharathi 
 Balakrishna
 K. S. Ashwath
 Loknath
 Pandari Bai
 Vasanthi
 Jayaram
 Sampath
 Shivaram
 Ganapathi Bhat
 Shakti Prasad

Soundtrack 
The music of the film was composed by Vijaya Bhaskar. The song "Nee Thanda Kanike" was received extremely well and considered as one of the evergreen duet songs.

Track list

See also
 Kannada films of 1972

References

External links 
 

1972 films
1970s Kannada-language films
Indian black-and-white films
Indian drama films
Films scored by Vijaya Bhaskar